The 2018–19 Albanian Women's National Championship was the 10th season of the Albanian Women's National Championship, the top Albanian women's league for association football clubs, since its establishment in 2009. The season started on 15 September 2018 and ended on 2 June 2019.

League table

Results

References

External links
Official website

Albanian Women's National Championship seasons
Alb
Women's National Championship